Bilinguites is a genus belonging to the Gastrioceratoidea superfamily. They are an extinct group of ammonoid, which are shelled cephalopods related to squids, belemnites, octopuses, and cuttlefish, and more distantly to the nautiloids.

References

 The Paleobiology Database accessed on 10/01/07

Goniatitida genera
Reticuloceratidae
Carboniferous ammonites
Ammonites of Asia
Paleozoic life of Nunavut